The Cerro Pico Blanco is the second highest mountain of the Cerros de Escazú, Costa Rica, with a summit elevation of . Pico Blanco means literally 'white peak', making reference of the rocky outcropping close to its highest point, that looks light gray from the Central Valley.

It is a good destination for a one-day hike and is a potentially promising location for rock climbing.

There is no relation to the endangered, endemic Pico Blanco Toad as it is reported to be found further to the southeast.

On January 15, 1990, a plane carrying 21 persons crashed near Pico Blanco, shortly after taking off from San Jose's Juan Santamaria Airport; all aboard perished.

See also
Cerro Rabo de Mico
Cerro Pico Alto
Cerro San Miguel

References

Mountains of the Cerros de Escazú
Mountains of Costa Rica